The Cape zoanthid (Isozoanthus capensis) is a species of zoanthid in the family Parazoanthidae.

Description
The Cape zoanthid is a small colonial, anemone-like anthozoan. It grows up to 0.5 cm across. It has an upright hollow columnar body with a tentacle-ringed mouth. It is orange to pink with a few spiky tentacles and a sand coated body column.

Distribution
It has so far been found only from the Cape Peninsula and to Port St Johns on the South African coast. It appears to be endemic to this area, and lives in shallow water.

Ecology
This zoanthid is usually found in small colonies of around 20-50 individuals under overhangs. It feeds on plankton.

References

Isozoanthus
Taxa named by Oskar Carlgren
Animals described in 1905